The men's 200 metre freestyle event at the 1968 Olympic Games took place on 24 October at the Alberca Olímpica Francisco Márquez. It was the third time the event was held, returning for the first time since 1904 (when the distance was measured in yards). There were 57 competitors from 26 nations, with each nation having up to three swimmers. The event was won by Michael Wenden of Australia, the nation's second victory in the event (68 years, but only two Games, apart); Australia extended its podium streak in the event to three Games over 68 years. It was Wenden's second gold medal of the Games, completing a 100/200 free double. Americans Don Schollander and John Nelson took silver and bronze, respectively (with the United States podium streak thereby being two Games over 64 years).

Background

This was the third appearance of the 200 metre freestyle event. It was first contested in 1900. It would be contested a second time, though at 220 yards, in 1904. After that, the event did not return until 1968; since then, it has been on the programme at every Summer Games.

Unsurprisingly, none of the competitors from the 1904 Games returned. Don Schollander was the heavy favourite in the event, having broken the world record five times since Tokyo 1964 (the last Games without the 200 metre freestyle on the programme). Schollander had won four Olympic gold medals in 1964, including anchoring the gold medal 4 × 200 metre freestyle relay. Michael Wenden of Australia had won the 100 metre freestyle (in which Schollander did not compete) earlier at the 1968 Olympics and was looking for a double.

19 of the 26 competing nations were making their debut in the event. Australia and the United States were the only two nations to have previously competed in both 1900 and 1904; France, Great Britain, Hungary, the Netherlands, and Sweden were making their second appearance after competing in 1900 only.

Competition format

The competition used a two-round (heats, final) format. The advancement rule followed the format introduced in 1952. A swimmer's place in the heat was not used to determine advancement; instead, the fastest times from across all heats in a round were used. There were 9 heats of between 5 and 8 swimmers each. The top 8 swimmers advanced to the final. Swim-offs were used as necessary to break ties.

This swimming event used freestyle swimming, which means that the method of the stroke is not regulated (unlike backstroke, breaststroke, and butterfly events). Nearly all swimmers use the front crawl or a variant of that stroke. Because an Olympic size swimming pool is 50 metres long, this race consisted of four lengths of the pool.

Records

The standing world and Olympic records prior to this competition were as follows. Clark's Olympic record was set as the first leg in the 4 × 200 metre freestyle relay final.

John Nelson set a new Olympic record at 1:59.5 in the first heat; Michael Wenden immediately broke it with 1:59.3 in the second. In the fourth and eighth heats, Don Schollander and Ralph Hutton tied the old record (behind Nelson and Wenden's new efforts).

Five of the finalists came in below the new record; Wenden finished first to improve his Olympic record to 1:55.2.

Schedule

All times are Central Standard Time (UTC-6)

Results

Heats

Nelson set a new Olympic record in the first heat; it was short-lived, as Wenden broke it in the second.

Final

References

Men's freestyle 200 metre
200 metre freestyle at the Olympics
Men's events at the 1968 Summer Olympics